Hit by Hit is the debut album by alternative rock band the Godfathers, released in November 1986. It was compiled from the Godfathers' three independent singles on their own Corporate Image label released between 1985 and 1986 ("I Want Everything", "This Damn Nation" and "Lonely Man"), plus one previously unreleased song, "Cold Turkey" (a John Lennon cover).

Critical reception
Trouser Press called it "an essential debut", writing, "Hit by Hit presents a band already sporting a remarkably clear vision. Titles like "I Want Everything," "This Damn Nation," "I Want You" and "I’m Unsatisfied," replete with explosive riffing and angry vocals, tell you nearly all you need to know about how the Godfathers saw their lot in Maggie Thatcher's England." In a retrospective review, Record Collector magazine wrote, "The sound of the first rebellion of the 80s London youth against Popworld PLC sounds remarkably fresh and relevant even today."

Track listing
Adapted from the deluxe edition liner notes.

Notes
 Tracks 3, 8 and 10 from Capo Di Tutti Capi EP. Recorded September 1985, released November 1985.
 Tracks 2, 4 and 7 from "This Damn Nation" single. Recorded January 1986, released March 1986.
 Tracks 1, 5 and 9 from "Sun Arise" / "I Want Everything" single. Recorded 16 June 1986, released September 1986.
 Track 6 previously unreleased.
 Tracks 11-13 from "Love Is Dead" single. Recorded at Elephant Studios, Wapping, released February 1987.

Note
 Tracks 9-16 (disc 2) recorded live around the world and mastered from cassettes at Hiltongrove Studios, London, September 2007 by David Blackman.

Personnel
The Godfathers
Peter Coyne – vocals
Chris Coyne – bass, vocals
Kris Dollimore – guitar, vocals
Mike Gibson – guitar, vocals
George Mazur – drums, percussion, vocals
Additional musicians
Ron Carthy – trumpet on "Gone to Texas"
Technical
Vic Maile – producer
Jean Luke Epstein – sleeve, design
Steve Double – photography

References

1986 debut albums
Albums produced by Vic Maile
The Godfathers albums